Kibol is a rural locality (a selo) in Seletskoye Rural Settlement, Suzdalsky District, Vladimir Oblast, Russia. The population was 8 as of 2010. There are 3 streets.

Geography 
Kibol is located on the Kamenka River, 6 km northwest of Suzdal (the district's administrative centre) by road. Suzdal is the nearest rural locality.

References 

Rural localities in Suzdalsky District